is a Japanese actress, formerly belonging on Takarazuka Revue's Flower Troupe, where she performed as a musumeyaku (actress specializing in female roles).

Background
Sakurano is from Tsuyama. She made her debut in the revue in 2002, and, in 2006, became the first of her class to attain the status of top star. She was the third and the last top star partner of Sumire Haruno. She was the most senior among the five musumeyaku top stars.

Troupe History
Flower Troupe: 2002–present

Notable Roles and Performances

Junior Cast 
  (April, 2002) —
 Elisabeth (October, 2002) — Black Angel
 La Esperanza (August–November, 2004) — Tracy

Regular Cast 
  (May, 2003) — Sen-hime
 A Tale of Two Cities (October, 2003) — Lucie Manette (Bow Hall performance, starring Jun Sena)
 Season of Angels (2004) — Ambassador's Wife
  (May–June, 2004) — Amina
  (March–July, 2005) — Olga O'Brien
 Kurawanka (2005) — Enyouhaku (Bow Hall performance, starring Ranju Tomu)
 Kurawanka (2005) — Ohatsu (Bow Hall performance, starring Aine Harei)
  (November, 2005) — Henriette

Top Star 
 Appartement Cinéma (March, 2006) — Anna; Top Star debut show
 Phantom (2006) — Christine Daae; Top Star debut show at the Grand Theater
  (2006) — Marie Vetsera
 Notebook of Kogorou Akechi — The Black Lizard - Madame Midorikawa (Black Lizard)
 Adieu Marseille (September–December, 1007) — Marienne
 Melancholic Gigolo - Felicia
 Love and Death in Arabia - Anoud
 Rose of Versailles Side Story: Alain - Diane
 The Legend - Kiha
 Sorrowful Cordoba - Eva Silvestre
 Me and My Girl - Sally Smith
 Rose of Versailles Side Story: Andre - Maryse
 Partners - Paris

External links
(ja) Takarazuka Revue Company Website
(ja) The official profile

People from Okayama Prefecture
Living people
Japanese actresses
Takarazuka Revue
1983 births